The Central Bank of the Comros (BCC) is the central bank of the Comoros, a group of islands in the Indian Ocean.

Operations

The statutes of the BCC state that its board of directors shall have eight members who are chosen from the Comorian Government, the French Central Bank (Banque de France) and the French government.  The post of Deputy Director of the Central Bank of the Comoros is held by a Banque de France official, who is responsible for monetary policy.  Since 19 November 1999, all the central bank's official rates have been pegged to the Euro Overnight Index Average (EONIA) leading to a stabilisation of interest rate differentials with the euro.

The BCC applies a compulsory reserves system (30% of deposits) and a bank monitoring system.  The headquarters are located in Moroni.

Banking system

The Comorian banking system is constituted of six different banks: the Central Bank (BCC); the Banque pour l'Industrie et pour le Commerce-Comores (BIC-C), the Banque de Développement des Comores (BDC), the Banque Fédérale de Commerce (BFC), the Exim Bank Comores SA and the Société Nationale des Postes et des Services Financiers (SNPSF). In addition, two mutual savings banks (SANDUK and MECK) play a role.

One of the roles of the Central Bank of the Comoros is to approve the establishment of new banks on all three islands of the Union of Comoros (Grande-Comore, Anjouan and Mohéli).

Governors 
The governor is appointed for a five-year term.

See also
 Banque de Madagascar
 Central banks and currencies of Africa
 Economy of Comoros
 List of banks in the Arab world
 List of central banks
 Comorian franc

References

External links
 Official site of Banque Centrale des Comores

Banks of the Comoros
Economy of the Comoros
Comoros
Moroni, Comoros
Banks established in 1981
1981 establishments in the Comoros